This is a recap of the 1974 season for the Professional Bowlers Association (PBA) Tour.  It was the tour's 16th season, and consisted of 31 events. Earl Anthony won back-to-back majors (in the Firestone Tournament of Champions and Brunswick PBA National Championship) among his six victories during the year, easily winning PBA Player of the Year honors. Anthony also joined Mike McGrath as the only PBA players to successfully defend a PBA National Championship.

The other major title of the season, the BPAA U.S. Open, was won by Larry Laub for his first major and sixth title overall.

In the 1974 season opener in Alameda, CA, a live national TV audience witnessed the PBA Tour's third televised 300 game, rolled by Jim Stefanich in a semi-final match.  Earl Anthony nearly duplicated the feat when he fired a 299 game in the final match of the season-ending Winston-Salem Hawaiian Invitational.

Tournament schedule

References

External links
1974 Season Schedule

Professional Bowlers Association seasons
1974 in bowling